Centrostigma is a genus of flowering plants from the orchid family, Orchidaceae. There are three currently accepted species, all native to Africa:

Centrostigma clavatum Summerh. - Tanzania, Malawi, Zambia, Congo-Kinshasa
Centrostigma occultans (Welw. ex Rchb.f.) Schltr. - Tanzania, Malawi, Zambia, Congo-Kinshasa, Zimbabwe, Angola, Transvaal
Centrostigma papillosum Summerh. - Zimbabwe, Angola, Malawi, Zambia

See also 
 List of Orchidaceae genera

References 

Pridgeon, A.M., Cribb, P.J., Chase, M.A. & Rasmussen, F. eds. (1999). Genera Orchidacearum 1. Oxford Univ. Press.
Pridgeon, A.M., Cribb, P.J., Chase, M.A. & Rasmussen, F. eds. (2001). Genera Orchidacearum 2. Oxford Univ. Press.
Pridgeon, A.M., Cribb, P.J., Chase, M.A. & Rasmussen, F. eds. (2003). Genera Orchidacearum 3. Oxford Univ. Press
Berg Pana, H. 2005. Handbuch der Orchideen-Namen. Dictionary of Orchid Names. Dizionario dei nomi delle orchidee. Ulmer, Stuttgart

Orchideae genera
Orchideae